Catch Me a Spy is a 1969 comedy spy thriller novel by George Marton and Tibor Meray.

Adaptation
In 1971 it was turned into a film of the same name starring Kirk Douglas, Marlène Jobert and Trevor Howard.

References

Bibliography
 Goble, Alan. The Complete Index to Literary Sources in Film. Walter de Gruyter, 1999.

1969 British novels
Hungarian novels
British comedy novels
British spy novels
British thriller novels
British novels adapted into films
Novels set in London
W. H. Allen & Co. books